Ham loaf or hamloaf is a baked meat dish, similar to meatloaf, made of ground ham and ground pork and combined with other ingredients to form a loaf like shape. Distinct in color and taste from meatloaf, hamloaf is often baked with a sweet glaze, often consisting of brown sugar, molasses, pineapples, or cherries. In Pennsylvania, hamloaf is sometimes served with a sauce consisting of vinegar, mustard, and brown sugar.  Eggs, milk, often evaporated, and some type of filling ingredient, bread or cracker crumbs, are used to create the loaf form.

Attributed as a traditional Pennsylvania Dutch cuisine, hamloaf is eaten throughout Pennsylvania, Ohio, Kentucky, Indiana, and many other midwest states and is often served on special occasions, including Easter.

References 

Baked foods